Det kunne vært deg is a 1952 Norwegian comedy film directed by Kåre Bergstrøm and Henki Kolstad, starring Inger Marie Andersen, Henki Kolstad and Wenche Foss. Recently wed Maisen (Andersen) and Harald "Pompen" (Kolstad) make a new acquaintance in Cornelius, a lifelong bachelor. On the way home, Maisen's husband Harald losses the key to their flat. They ask their neighbor for help and then their marriage falters, but the neighbor steps up.

External links
 
 

1952 films
1952 comedy films
Norwegian comedy films
Norwegian black-and-white films
1950s Norwegian-language films
Films directed by Kåre Bergstrøm